Gintautas Matulis (born December 6, 1986) is a professional Lithuanian basketball player for Juventus Utena of the LKL. He plays the shooting guard and small forward positions.

Career
Matulis spent the 2017-2018 season with Nevėžis Kėdainiai in the Lithuanian Basketball League and FIBA Europe Cup. On July 5, 2018, he signed with Þór Þorlákshöfn of the Icelandic Úrvalsdeild karla. He left the team in November due to injuries after averaging 9.8 points and 5.0 rebounds in 4 games.

References

External links
Profile at realgm.com
Icelandic leagues statistics at kki.is

1986 births
Living people
Shooting guards
Small forwards
Lithuanian men's basketball players
Sportspeople from Rokiškis
Úrvalsdeild karla (basketball) players
Þór Þorlákshöfn (basketball club) players